The United States competed at the 1964 Summer Olympics in Tokyo, Japan. 346 competitors, 267 men and 79 women, took part in 159 events in 19 sports.

Athletics

Men's Competition
Men's 100 meters 
Bob Hayes
Mel Pender
Trent Jackson

Men's 200 meters 
Henry Carr
Mike Larrabee
Dick Stebbins

Men's 400 meters 
Mike Larrabee
Ulis Williams
Olan Cassell
 
Men's 800 meters 
Tom Farrell
Jerry Siebert
Morgan Groth

Men's 1.500 meters 
Dyrol Burleson
Tom O'Hara
Jim Ryun

Men's 5,000 meters 
Bob Schul
Bill Dellinger
Oscar Moore

Men's 10,000 meters 
Billy Mills
Gerry Lindgren
Ron Larrieu

Men's Marathon 
Buddy Edelen
Billy Mills
Peter McArdle

Men's 110 meter Hurdles 

Men's 400 meter Hurdles 

Men's 3,000 meter Steeplechase 
George Young
Vic Zwolak
Jeff Fishback

Men's 4 × 100 m Relay 

Men's 4 × 400 m Relay 

Men's 20 km Walk 

Men's 50 km Walk 

  
Men's Long Jump 
Ralph Boston

 
Men's triple jump 

Men's High Jump 
Edward Caruthers

  
Men's Pole Vault 
Fred Hansen
John Pennel

 
Men's Shot Put 

Men's Javelin Throw 

Men's Discus Throw 
Al Oerter

Dave Weill

Men's Hammer Throw

 
Men's Decathlon 

Women's Competition
Women's 100 meters 

Women's 200 meters 

 
Women's 400 meters 

 
Women's 800 meters 

 
Women's 4 × 100 m Relay 

Women's 80m Hurdles 

Women's Long Jump 

 
Women's High Jump 

Women's Shot Put 

Women's Javelin Throw

Women's Discus Throw

Women's Pentathlon

Basketball

Boxing

Bob Watkins, Fairmont, WV. Silver Medal

Canoeing

Cycling

Sixteen cyclists represented the United States in 1964.

Individual road race
 John Allis
 Michael Hiltner
 Raymond Castilloux
 Thomas Montemage

Team time trial
 Michael Hiltner
 John Allis
 Michael Allen
 Wes Chowen

Sprint
 Alan Grieco
 Jackie Simes

1000m time trial
 William Kund

Tandem
 Jack Disney
 Tim Mountford

Individual pursuit
 Skip Cutting

Team pursuit
 Hans Wolf
 Oliver Martin
 Donald Nelsen
 Arnold Uhrlass

Diving

Equestrian

Fencing

18 fencers represented the United States in 1964.

Men's foil
 Albie Axelrod
 Herbert Cohen
 Ed Richards

Men's team foil
 Larry Anastasi, Eugene Glazer, Herbert Cohen, Albie Axelrod, Ed Richards

Men's épée
 David Micahnik
 Paul Pesthy
 Frank Anger

Men's team épée
 Paul Pesthy, Frank Anger, David Micahnik, Larry Anastasi

Men's sabre
 Thomas Orley
 Gene Hámori
 Attila Keresztes

Men's team sabre
 Alfonso Morales, Robert Blum, Gene Hámori, Attila Keresztes, Thomas Orley

Women's foil
 Harriet King
 Jan York-Romary
 Tommy Angell

Women's team foil
 Anne Drungis, Jan York-Romary, Denise O'Connor, Harriet King, Tommy Angell

Gymnastics

Judo

Modern pentathlon

Three pentathletes represented the United States in 1964. They won a silver medal in the team event.

Individual
 James Moore
 David Kirkwood
 Paul Pesthy

Team
 James Moore
 Dave Kirkwood
 Paul Pesthy

Rowing

Sailing

Shooting

Ten shooters represented the United States in 1964. Between them they won two golds, a silver and three bronze medals.

25 m pistol
 Bill McMillan
 Edwin Teague

50 m pistol
 Frank Green
 Thomas Smith

300 m rifle, three positions
 Gary Anderson
 Martin Gunnarsson

50 m rifle, three positions
 Lones Wigger
 Tommy Pool

50 m rifle, prone
 Lones Wigger
 Tommy Pool

Trap
 Bill Morris
 Frank Little

Swimming

Volleyball

Men's team competition
 Round robin
 Defeated Netherlands (3-0)
 Defeated South Korea (3-2) 
 Lost to Hungary (0-3)
 Lost to Czechoslovakia (0-3)
 Lost to Japan (1-3)
 Lost to Bulgaria (0-3)
 Lost to Soviet Union (0-3)
 Lost to Brazil (2-3) 
 Lost to Romania (1-3) → Ninth place
Team roster
 Mike Bright
 Barry Brown
 Keith Erickson
 Bill Griebenow
 Richard Hammer
 Jacob Highland
 Ron Lang
 Charles Nelson
 Mike O'Hara
 Ernie Suwara
 John Taylor
 Pedro Velasco
Head coach: Harry Wilson

Women's team competition
 Round robin
 Lost to Japan (0-3) 
 Lost to Poland (0-3) 
 Lost to Romania (0-3) 
 Lost to Soviet Union (0-3) 
 Defeated South Korea (3-0) → Fifth place
Team roster
 Jean Gaertner
 Lou Galloway
 Barbara Harwerth
 Patti Lucas-Bright
 Linda Murphy
 Gail O'Rourke
 Nancy Owen
 Mary Jo Peppler
 Mary Margaret Perry
 Sharon Peterson
 Verneda Thomas
 Jane Ward
Head coach: Doc Burroughs

Water polo

Weightlifting

Wrestling

References

External links
Official Olympic Reports
International Olympic Committee results database
USA Volleyball

Nations at the 1964 Summer Olympics
1964
Oly